ISMI may refer to one of the following

 income support mortgage interest, social benefit in the UK to pay the mortgage interest
Isotopic Solutions for Medicine and Industry Limited
Institute for the Study of Modern Israel
Institute for the Study of Man, Inc.
International Sematech Manufacturing Initiative
Ismi, a German exonym for a Hungarian place Izmény